"No Shame" is the debut single by Australian recording artist Sarah De Bono, taken from her debut studio album No Shame. It was released digitally on 29 June 2012, as the album's lead single. The song was written by Nicole Morier, Magnus Lidehall, Vincent Pontare and Seinabo Sey and produced by Stuart Crichton and Eric J Dubowsky. "No Shame" debuted and peaked at number 50 ARIA Singles Chart.

Background and reception
"No Shame" would have been De Bono's winner's single for The Voice (Australia), if she had won the show. De Bono explained the concept of the song, stating "It's about being original, being comfortable in your own skin with no shame!". Cameron Adams of News.com.au wrote that the song sounded like "a one-woman Girls Aloud" and described it as "noisy electropop". "No Shame" debuted on the ARIA Singles Chart at number 50 on 9 July 2012. The following week, the song left the ARIA top 100.

Track listing
Digital download
 "No Shame" – 4:09

Charts

Release history

References

2012 songs
2012 debut singles
Sarah De Bono songs
Electropop songs
Songs written by Magnus Lidehäll
Songs written by Vincent Pontare
Songs written by Kenzie (songwriter)
Songs written by Nicole Morier
Universal Music Group singles